444 Combat Support Squadron is an Air Force unit with the Canadian Armed Forces. Based at CFB Goose Bay, it provides helicopter support to the base operations.

History
444 Fighter Squadron was formed in March 1953 at CFB St. Hubert, Quebec and moved to CFB Baden-Soellingen in West Germany.

Disbanded 1967, it was re-formed as 444 Tactical Helicopter Squadron at CFB Lahr, West Germany in 1972 as part of Canadian Forces Europe until 1991 and again in CFB Goose Bay in 1993.

Past Aircraft
 de Havilland Canada DHC-1 Chipmunk April 1948 – 1949
 Auster AOP.6 June 1948 – 1949
 CL-13 Sabre 1953–1962
 CF-104 Starfighter 1962–1972
 CH-112 Nomad 1961–1972
 CH-136 Kiowa 1972–1991
 CH-135 Twin Huey 1993–1996

References

Military units and formations of Quebec
Royal Canadian Air Force squadrons
Canadian Forces aircraft squadrons
Military units and formations established in 1953